David Reece Bowen (born October 21, 1932) was a U.S. Representative from Mississippi.

Born in Houston, Mississippi, Bowen was graduated from Cleveland High School (Cleveland, Mississippi) in 1950.
He attended the University of Missouri from 1950 to 1952 before graduating from Harvard University in 1954. After receiving a Master of Arts degree at the University of Oxford in Oxford, England in 1956, Bowen enlisted in the United States Army, serving as a private first class from 1957 to 1958.

He served as assistant professor of political science and history at Mississippi College from 1958 to 1959 and Millsaps College from 1959 to 1964. He was employed by U.S. Office of Economic Opportunity from 1966 to 1967, the U.S. Chamber of Commerce from 1967 to 1968, and was first coordinator of federal-state programs at the State of Mississippi from 1968 to 1972.

Bowen was elected as a Democrat to the Ninety-third and to the four succeeding Congresses (January 3, 1973 – January 3, 1983). He was not a candidate for reelection in 1982 to the Ninety-eighth Congress. After retiring from Congress Bowen served as a visiting lecturer at Mississippi State University from 1985 to 1987.

References

1932 births
Living people
Democratic Party members of the United States House of Representatives from Mississippi
United States Army soldiers
University of Missouri alumni
Harvard University alumni
Alumni of the University of Oxford
People from Houston, Mississippi
Military personnel from Mississippi